Philip Anthony Slocombe (born 6 September 1954) is a retired English cricketer who played for Somerset throughout his career. He was a right-handed opening batsman and right-arm medium pace bowler. He was part of the NatWest Trophy winning team of 1983.

Career
Born 6 September 1954 in Weston-super-Mare, Somerset, Slocombe was educated at Millfield School, Slocombe was part of the Somerset Second XI team at the age of 14. He made his first-class debut against Sussex in May 1975, scoring 61 not out batting at number seven. In only his third County Championship match for Somerset, he made his maiden century while playing against Gloucestershire. A further century while opening the second innings against Nottinghamshire helped him become Somerset's first batsman to score 1,000 runs in his first full season.

Slocombe's strong performances in his debut season saw him included in DH Robins' XI tour of South Africa in 1976 that included Fred Titmus and was captained by David Lloyd. He played twice, against Western Province and Eastern Province, but only scored 27 runs. He was also part of the Marylebone Cricket Club team that was devastated by the bowling of Paddy Clift during the 1976 season opener against County Champions Leicestershire.

By the third game of the 1976 County Championship season, Slocombe was opening the batting with Brian Rose. He continued to open the batting for the majority of his career, forging a lasting partnership with Rose. He found it difficult to replicate his success of the 1975 season, only achieving 1,000 runs in a season once more in 1978.

Later life
Since retiring from cricket, Slocombe worked with his wife, trading in antiques in Dallas, Texas and later as patron of a country house hotel in Brittany, France. He was married to Susan for 28 years before she died in 2008. Slocombe formed The Rare and Fine Wine Company in 1995 and trades from offices in Fulham, London specialising in fine wines from Bordeaux, Burgundy, Champagne and Italy.

Notes

External links

Somerset cricketers
English cricketers
1954 births
Living people
People from Weston-super-Mare
People educated at Millfield
Marylebone Cricket Club cricketers
D. H. Robins' XI cricketers